Nationality words link to articles with information on the nation's poetry or literature (for instance, Irish or France).

Events
 Tuscan poet Vincenzo da Filicaja becomes governor of Volterra.

Works
 Aphra Behn - The Unfortunate Happy Lady
 John Wilmot, Earl of Rochester, Poems, (&c.) On Several Occasions: with Valentinian; a Tragedy, London: Printed by Jacob Tonson, posthumously published

Births
Death years link to the corresponding "[year] in poetry" article:
 July 14 – William Oldys (died 1761), English antiquary, bibliographer and poet
 Matthew Green (died 1737), English writer of light verse and customs official

Deaths
Birth years link to the corresponding "[year] in poetry" article:
 January 3 – Mary Mollineux (born c.1651), English poet
 August 9 – Wacław Potocki (born 1621), Polish nobleman (Szlachta), moralist, poet and writer
 September 8 – Henry Birkhead (born 1617), English academic, lawyer, Latin poet and founder of the Oxford Chair of Poetry
 November 26 – Gregório de Matos (born 1636), Brazilian Baroque poet

See also

 List of years in poetry
 List of years in literature
 17th century in poetry
 17th century in literature
 Poetry

Notes

External links
 "A Timeline of Poetry in English" at the Representative Poetry Online website of the University of Toronto

17th-century poetry
Poetry